Suno is a comune (municipality) in the Province of Novara in the Italian region Piedmont, located about  northeast of Turin and about  northwest of Novara.

Suno borders the following municipalities: Agrate Conturbia, Bogogno, Cavaglietto, Cressa, Fontaneto d'Agogna, Mezzomerico, and Vaprio d'Agogna.

History 
Suno was a Roman Colonia. It was also called Xuno or Xunum and its territory, mostly characterised by hills, allowed inhabitants to exploit resources. It included different hamlets in which finds have been made. After the fall of the Roman Empire, Suno was occupied by Lombards, who found a city almost destroyed and abandoned. Around 900 a.C. Suno's wealth was represented by various monuments and churches, some of which are still visible today. Starting from the plague epidemic of 1521-1630, economic problems arose and the country remained undeveloped industrially. This leads its economy to be based mainly on agriculture and livestock. Indeed, Suno is known as "The city of wine" and it's specialised in cattle breeding.

Monuments and Architecture 

 Castle of Suno.
Parish church of San Genesio. 
War Memorial.

References

External links
 Official website

Cities and towns in Piedmont